Jacques-Julien Siwe (born 29 July 2001) is a French professional footballer who plays as a forward for  club Guingamp.

Career
On 6 January 2018, Siwe signed first professional contract with Dijon. He made his professional debut with the club in a 3–0 Ligue 1 loss to Monaco on 11 April 2021. On 25 June 2021, Siwe signed for Championnat National club Annecy.

Personal life
Born in France, Siwe is of Cameroonian descent.

References

External links
 

2001 births
Living people
People from Saint-Maurice, Val-de-Marne
Footballers from Val-de-Marne
French sportspeople of Cameroonian descent
Black French sportspeople
French footballers
Association football forwards
AS Choisy-le-Roi players
US Créteil-Lusitanos players
Dijon FCO players
FC Annecy players
En Avant Guingamp players
Ligue 1 players
Ligue 2 players
Championnat National 2 players
Championnat National 3 players
Championnat National players